Homeobox protein Hox-D11 is a protein that in humans is encoded by the HOXD11 gene.

This gene belongs to the homeobox family of genes. The homeobox genes encode a highly conserved family of transcription factors that play an important role in morphogenesis in all multicellular organisms. Mammals possess four similar homeobox gene clusters, HOXA, HOXB, HOXC and HOXD, located on different chromosomes, consisting of 9 to 11 genes arranged in tandem. This gene is one of several homeobox HOXD genes located in a cluster on chromosome 2. Deletions that remove the entire HOXD gene cluster or the 5' end of this cluster have been associated with severe limb and genital abnormalities. The product of the mouse Hoxd11 gene plays a role in axial skeleton development and forelimb morphogenesis.

See also
 Homeobox

References

Further reading

External links 
 

Transcription factors